Our Crowd: The Great Jewish Families of New York (1967) is a history book by American writer Stephen Birmingham. The book documents the lives of prominent New York Jewish families of the 19th century. Historian Louis Auchincloss called it "A fascinating and absorbing chapter of New York social and financial history. ... " It has been reprinted 14 times as of 2007.

Review

Official information

References

External links
 "Our Crowd: The Great Jewish Families of New York (1967)", Time
 Information at Worldcat.com
  (1996 printing, with preview)

1967 non-fiction books
Jews and Judaism in New York City
Harper & Row books
German-Jewish culture in New York City
Upper class culture in New York City